Lights of Endangered Species is the fifth studio album by Matthew Good, released on May 31, 2011. The album's first single, "In a Place of Lesser Men", was released via SoundCloud two months prior on March 21, 2011. Subsequently, "Non Populus" was also released four days later. Five days ahead of the album release, the entire album was available to stream online via ExploreMusic. The album debuted at #5 on the Canadian Albums Chart. The album was nominated for Rock Album of the Year at the 2012 Juno Awards. Good has stated that it is his favourite of his own albums.

Background
Produced by Warne Livesey, Lights marked the sixth album the two had worked on together (including Matthew Good Band discography). While Good's lyrics on Lights remain socio-political and personal in nature, the album marks a departure from Good's rock-driven style with layered arrangements and instrumentation featuring horns, strings, woodwinds and piano – a reflection of Good's musical upbringing and tastes, listening to big bands from Glenn Miller to Count Basie, as well as modern jazz, such as Miles Davis and Mingus. He also singled out the horn section on Simon and Garfunkel's "Keep the Customer Satisfied" as a particular influence for the album's fifth track, "Zero Orchestra". The musical style also marked an effort from Good and Livesey to create something that was not necessarily "commercially viable", an idea that the two first discussed when they were mixing 1997's Underdogs. Good has recalled writing what would be the eighth track on Lights, "Set Me on Fire", as having re-energized the concept.

Good and Livesey first experimented with a Vancouver-based group of musicians to play the horns on the album, but described the results as "horrifying". They subsequently contacted Nashville-based Terry Townson, who they ultimately stuck with, on the advice of The Odds' Craig Northey. Townson, in turn, brought in other musicians to complete the recording. Lights also features Good's daughter singing in the background on "Shallow's Low".

Track listing
All tracks written by Matthew Good.

Credits
Matthew Good - piano, guitar, bass, claratron, vocals
Stuart Cameron - guitar, lap steel
Blake Manning - drums, percussion, glockenspiel, backing vocals
David Harding - viola
Andrew Brown - viola
Mary Sokol Brown - violin
David Brown - double bass
Brenda Fedoruk - flute
François Houle - clarinet
David Owen - cor anglais
Ingrid Chiang - bassoon
Warne Livesey - organ, mellotron
Terry Townson - trumpet, flugelhorn
Rod Murray - trombone
Oliver De Clercq - French horn
Bill Runge - baritone saxophone
Jeremy Berkman - trombone
Brad Muirhead - bass trombone
Avery Grace - backing vocals
Jennifer Zall - backing vocals
Warne Livesey - producer, mixer, engineer
Joel Livesey - engineer 
Rob Sommerfeldt, Jennifer Zall, Paul Dutil - session assistants
Tim Young - mastering at Metropolis, London, UK
Bernie Breen - management 
Jenn Pressey and Sarah Osgoode - assistants
Shawn Marino - A&R, Universal Music
Matthew Good and Susan Michalek - art direction
Susan Michalek - design
Miriam Aroeste - cover artwork

Recorded and mixed at Vogville Recording, Port Coquitlam, Canada
Strings, brass, and woodwinds arranged by Matthew Good and Warne Livesey

References

External links
Lights of Endangered Species Album Timeline

2011 albums
Matthew Good albums
Universal Music Canada albums
Albums produced by Warne Livesey
Concept albums